This is a list of Article III United States federal judges by longevity of service. The judges on the lists below were presidential appointees who have been confirmed by the Senate, and who served on the federal bench for over 40 years. It includes neither Article I judges (e.g., U.S. Tax Court, bankruptcy courts, administrative tribunals) nor Article IV judges (e.g., territorial courts).

Total combined service

United States Supreme Court
No Justice has served actively on the United States Supreme Court for over 40 years, but six have eclipsed that timespan through senior service.

United States courts of appeals
Only one judge, Gerald Bard Tjoflat, has served more than 40 years actively on an intermediate appellate court constituted by the Judiciary Act of 1869 or subsequent legislation, however many have eclipsed that timespan through senior service:

United States district courts
Judges who have sat on a United States District Court for more than 40 years.

Sources
 Federal Judicial Center

See also
List of United States Supreme Court justices by time in office
Deaths of United States federal judges in active service
List of members of the United States Congress by longevity of service

References

General

 

Specific

United States, Judges, Federal
Federal, Longevity
Longevity